Hroznová Lhota is a municipality and village in Hodonín District in the South Moravian Region of the Czech Republic. It has about 1,200 inhabitants.

Geography
The White Carpathians Protected Landscape Area extends from the south just into centre of the municipality.

Etymology
The municipality has a long vine-growing tradition, hence the name meaning Grapes' Lhota which has been in use since late 16th century. Prior it the municipality was named just Lhota or Lhota Veselská.

Notable people
Joža Uprka (1861–1940), painter; lived and died here

References

External links

Villages in Hodonín District
Moravian Slovakia